Waukesha County is a county in the U.S. state of Wisconsin.

Waukesha County may also refer to:

 Waukesha County Airport, Waukesha County, Wisconsin, US
 Waukesha County Technical College, Waukesha County, Wisconsin, US

See also